State Road 313 (NM 313) is a  state highway in the US state of New Mexico. NM 313's southern terminus is at NM 556 in Albuquerque, and the northern terminus is at the end of state maintenance in San Felipe Pueblo. Much of the route is an old routing of U.S. Route 85.

Route description

NM 313 begins at a roundabout intersection with NM 556 in far northern Bernalillo County, within the Sandia Pueblo and just outside the city limits of Albuquerque. The route runs to the northeast from here, along the eastern side of the Rio Grande. It enters Sandoval County, passing through Pueblo of Sandia Village. The route then exits the Sandia Pueblo and enters the city of Bernalillo, where it has a junction with US 550. The route is known in this area as Camino del Pueblo. NM 313 continues to the northeast through Santa Ana Pueblo and into the city of Algodones, where NM 315 provides access to Interstate 25. The route finally ends at the end of state maintenance in San Felipe Pueblo.

Major intersections

See also

References

External links

313
Transportation in Bernalillo County, New Mexico
Transportation in Sandoval County, New Mexico
Transportation in Albuquerque, New Mexico
U.S. Route 85